The men's three-cushion billiards singles tournament at the 2010 Asian Games in Guangzhou took place from 15 November to 17 November at Asian Games Town Gymnasium.

Tsuyoshi Suzuki of Japan won the gold medal after beating his teammate Joji Kai in the final.

Schedule
All times are China Standard Time (UTC+08:00)

Results
Legend
WO — Won by walkover

References 
Results
Draw

External links 
 Cue Sports results at the official site of 2010 Asian Games 

Cue sports at the 2010 Asian Games